The AFF U-17 Youth Championship was played for the first time in 2005.

The championship was held in Bangkok, Thailand from 26 August to 4 September 2005

Seven nations took part, all from the ASEAN region. No guest nations were invited.

The seven teams were drawn into 2 groups. One group of 3 nations and the second group of 4 nations. The winners and runners up would progress to the semi-final stage.

Participating nations

Fixtures and results

Group stage

Group A

Group B

Knockout stage

Bracket

Semi-finals

Third place play-off

Final

See also 
Football at the Southeast Asian Games
AFC
AFC Asian Cup
East Asian Cup
Arabian Gulf Cup
South Asian Football Federation Cup
West Asian Football Federation Championship

External links 
ASEAN Football Federation

2005 in AFF football
2007
2005 in youth association football